Matías Ezequiel Rudler (born 25 April 1988) is an Argentine footballer who plays as a defender for Atlètic Escaldes.

Career

Rudler started his career with Argentine third division side All Boys where he made 17 league appearances and scored 1 goal and helped them achieve promotion to the Argentine top flight within 3 seasons.

In 2014, Rudler signed for Independiente de Chivilcoy in the Argentine fourth division after playing for Argentine top flight club San Martín de San Juan, before joining San Lorenzo de Alem in the Argentine third division.

In 2019, he signed for Andorran team Engordany.

References

External links
 
 

Argentine footballers
Primera Divisió players
Expatriate footballers in Andorra
Living people
Argentine expatriate footballers
1988 births
Footballers from Buenos Aires
All Boys footballers
San Martín de San Juan footballers
Deportivo Merlo footballers
Barracas Central players
Association football defenders
Primera Nacional players
Argentine Primera División players
Torneo Federal A players
Primera B Metropolitana players